Museums in French Polynesia include:

 Musée de Tahiti et des Îles
 James Norman Hall Home
 Robert Wan Pearl Museum
 Paul Gauguin Museum

Buildings and structures in French Polynesia
French Polynesia
French Polynesia
French Polynesia-related lists